The  was a 1905 German design which was purchased by the Empire of Japan as the standard field gun of the Imperial Japanese Army at the end of the Russo-Japanese War. The Type 38 designation was given to this gun as it was accepted in the 38th year of Emperor Meiji's reign (1905).

History and development

Although Japan had extensive experience with artillery, as the result of its war with Russia in 1904-05, and had the technology and industrial infrastructure to construct medium or large caliber naval weapons prior to World War I, planners at the Imperial Japanese Army General Staff turned to Krupp in Germany, for the latest trend in artillery design. Initial units of Krupp 7.5 cm Model 1903 were imported, and then eventually over 2,000 units, designated "Type 38" in Japan, were produced under license by the army’s Osaka Arsenal.

The original Type 38 gun had a conical interrupted screw, a single box type trail which limited gun elevation to only 16°30'. Also, there were no equilibrators as the trunnions were at the gun barrel's center of balance. All of these shortcomings were remedied with a redesign following World War I.

After World War I, these weapons were considered largely obsolete. However, by this time, Japanese production capabilities had improved, and the Type 38 underwent a re-design in Japan to improve the carriage, with a corresponding increase in elevation, range and rate of fire to 10-12 rounds per minute.

Design
The Type 38 75 mm field gun was a thoroughly conventional design for its day, complete with crew seats on the gun shield and a solid box trail. It had a hydrospring recoil system, interrupted screw type breechblock, and a 1/16-inch gun shield.

At some point prior to the Second Sino-Japanese War (sources differ as to when) the Type 38 was extensively modified. The piece was trunnioned forward and equilibrators were added to compensate for muzzle heaviness. It was given a hollow box trail that allowed elevation to 43°. The new version was called the "improved Type 38". Some 400 units were produced in Japan, and it is unclear exactly how many Type 38s were upgraded to the improved version. However, both types were still in service in limited numbers by the start of World War II, despite efforts to replace the design with the Type 90 75 mm field gun.

The Type 38 75 mm field gun (improved) was capable of firing high-explosive, armor-piercing warhead, shrapnel, incendiary, smoke and illumination and gas shells.

Combat record
Despite its obsolescence, the Type 38 75 mm field gun was found in theatres of operation in the Second Sino-Japanese War, Soviet-Japanese Border Wars and in the Pacific War.

References

Notes

Bibliography
 Bishop, Chris (eds) The Encyclopedia of Weapons of World War II. Barnes & Nobel. 1998. 
 (British) General Staff, War Office. "The Russo-Japanese War"; Reports From British Officers Attached To The Russian Forces In The Field.  Vol. III, July 1907.
 Chamberlain, Peter and Gander, Terry. Light and Medium Field Artillery. Macdonald and Jane's (1975). 
 Chant, Chris. Artillery of World War II, Zenith Press, 2001, 
 McLean, Donald B. Japanese Artillery; Weapons and Tactics. Wickenburg, Ariz.: Normount Technical Publications 1973. .
 Mayer, S.L. The Rise and Fall of Imperial Japan. The Military Press (1984) 
 Neuffer, William LT. "What Lessons In The Employment Of Field Artillery Should Be Deduced From The Experiences Of The Russo-Japanese War?" The Field Artillery Journal (Artilleristische Monatshefts. No. 35 November 1909); by William Neuffer, Lieutenant of the 3rd Bavarian (Prince Leopold) Regiment of Field Artillery
 US Department of War Special Series No 25  Japanese Field Artillery October 1944
 US Department of War, TM 30-480, Handbook on Japanese Military Forces, Louisiana State University Press, 1994.

External links
 Type 38 on Taki's Imperial Japanese Army page
 US Technical Manual E 30-480

3
World War II field artillery
3
75 mm artillery
Artillery of Manchukuo